Farroukh Qasim ((17 September 1948 – 7 February 2010) is a Tajik actor and Persian theatre director from Tajikistan. In 2004, he was a laureate of the international Prince Claus Awards for having "brought renewal to theatre in Tajikistan through his approach to the creative reworking of an eclectic repertoire".

Overview

Farroukh Qasim was born on 17 September 1948 in Dushanbe and died on 7 February 2010 in Dushanbe.PCA, op. cit.

A renowned theatre director, he created performances based on sources as varied as Rumi, Zoroastrian and Koranic texts, Sufi mystics, and plays by Molière and Bulgakov. For instance, a Tajik version of King Lear incorporating 10th century Persian verses.

In 2004, he was a laureate of Netherlands's international Prince Claus Awards as "an outstanding actor" who "had brought renewal to theatre in Tajikistan through his approach to the creative reworking of an eclectic repertoire", honoring him "for his creative contributions to performance art and literature in Tajikistan".

See also
 Cinema of Iran
 Persian theatre

References

 Sources consulted 

 

 Endnotes

Ethnic Tajik people
Tajikistani artists
1948 births
2010 deaths